William "Tangier" Smith (February 2, 1655 – February 18, 1705) was a governor of Tangier, on the coast of Morocco, and an early settler of New York who owned more than  of Atlantic Ocean waterfront property in central Long Island in New York State, in what is called the Manor of St. George. In 1701, he was Acting Governor of New York.

Early life
Smith was born on February 2, 1655, in Higham Ferrers, Northamptonshire, in England.

Career
He was sent to join his uncle William Staines in English Tangier and was elected Common Councilman of Tangier in 1677, becoming an alderman there in 1679. He was mayor from 1682 until the English evacuated the colony in October 1683, following attacks by forces under Ismail Ibn Sharif. During Smith's term as mayor, the English demolished the city's fortifications, as part of the evacuation of the Tangier Garrison.

Smith next settled in the City of London, where he had a trading business in Long Acre.

Life in America
In 1686, Smith and his wife and three of his children sailed from Cork in Ireland to New York at the urging of Thomas Dongan, 2nd Earl of Limerick, who had been Lieutenant-Governor of Tangier during Smith's years there and had now been named Provincial Governor of New York. Smith's daughter Hibernia died during the passage to North America aboard the ship Thomas.

Smith received grants of land from Lord Limerick and supplemented them with large purchases of Native American land. On May 25, 1691, Smith purchased a substantial tract of the land that is now the Town of Brookhaven, New York, from John Mayhew of the Unkechaug Nation.

Smith eventually accumulated more than  stretching from Riverhead, New York, in the north east to the Carmans River at Shirley, New York, in the south west. Additionally, he gained title to all of Fire Island, New York.

The deal cemented when Colonial New York Governor Benjamin Fletcher granted Smith a patent to establish a manor on the land which was to be called the Manor of St. George: a section of land stretching from Riverhead to Mastic, New York. Smith was to oversee the Manor from land he had bought earlier in Setauket, New York, also in the Town of Brookhaven.

He was appointed to the Governor's Council in 1691. That year, he also served as one of the commissioners of oyer and terminer who tried and condemned Jacob Leisler, and he was appointed to the Supreme Court of the Province of New York. In 1692 he was made Chief Justice of that court. In 1701 he served for several months as Acting Governor of New York following the death of the governor and the absence of the lieutenant governor.

Personal life
Smith married the English-born Martha Tunstall in Tangier in 1675. They had thirteen (possibly fourteen) children born to this union which were:

 Elizabeth Smith (1676–1681), born and died in Tangier
 John Smith (1677–1677/8), born and died in Tangier
 Col. Henry Smith (1678/9–1766), born in Tangier and died at Manor of St. George, Setauket, Long Island, New York
 William Smith (I) (1679/80–1680), born and died in Tangier
 Martha "Patty" Smith (1681–1736), born and died in New York or Manor of Scarsdale, Westchester, New York. She married Caleb Heathcote, an English-born mayor of New York City.
 Mary Smith (1682–1684), born in Tangier and died in Long Acre, England
 William Smith, Jr. (II) (1683/4–1683/4), born at Long Acre and died in Old Brainford, London
 Hibernia Smith (1686–1686), born at Youghal, County Cork, Ireland and died at sea.
 Jeane (Janey) Smith (1687–after September 7, 1707), born in New York
 Maj. William Henry Smith (1688/9–1742/3), born in Brookhaven, Long Island, New York
 Gloryana Smith (1690–1710), born in Brookhaven and died at Manor of Scarsdale
 Theodocia Smith (1691–1691), born and died in Brookhaven
 Charles Jeffery (Jeffry) Smith (1693–1715), born and died in at Manor of St. George
 Gilbert Smith (d. 1742), possibly a child of Smith and Tunstall

After Smith's death, his heirs built a house on Bellport Bay that today is called the "Manor of St. George." A peninsula projecting into Narrow Bay and connecting Bellport with Moriches Bay is called Smith's Point and is the source of the name for Smith Point County Park. The names of "Smith", "Manor" and "Tangier" are used extensively as placenames throughout Brookhaven, including Manorville, New York.

Descendants
Smith's descendants include: Franklin Delano Roosevelt (1882–1945), though Col. Henry Smith by his wife, Anna Shepard, John Smith (1752–1816), and William Sidney Mount (1807–1868). The descendants of William Tangier Smith continue to frequently use Tangier as part of their name.

References

External links

1655 births
1705 deaths
People from Higham Ferrers
People from New York (state)
People from Tangier
Members of the New York Executive Council